Norwegian Church may refer to:

Church organisations

Norway
Church of Norway, a Lutheran denomination of Protestant Christianity
Church City Mission, a diaconal foundation in many cities and towns in Norway 
Norwegian Church Abroad, or the Norwegian Seamen's Church
Norwegian Church Aid, a Norwegian humanitarian and ecumenical organisation, relief work in many countries
Catholic Church in Norway
Church of Norway in Exile, a former independent Lutheran deanery
Evangelical Lutheran Free Church of Norway

United States
The Norwegian Lutheran Church in the United States
United Norwegian Lutheran Church of America
Norwegian Augustana Synod
Conference of the Norwegian-Danish Evangelical Lutheran Church of America

Church buildings

Norway
Churches in Norway
Brampton Lutheran Church in Western Norway Emigration Center, Radøy, Norway, relocated from Brampton Township, North Dakota, U.S.

South Georgia
Norwegian Anglican Church, Grytviken, formerly Norwegian Lutheran Church

United Kingdom
Norwegian Church, Cardiff
Norwegian Church, Swansea
Norwegian Fishermans' Church, Liverpool
Norwegian Church, London, one of the Nordic churches in London

United States
List of Norwegian churches in the United States

See also
Stave church (includes list of such churches, including Norwegian ones)